Maulana Fazal-ur-Rehman (born 19 June 1953) is a Pakistani Islamic fundamentalist politician who is the president of Jamiat Ulema-e-Islam (F). He is also the president of the Pakistan Democratic Movement (PDM), a coalition of political parties which ousted then prime minister Imran Khan through a no-confidence motion in 2022. He was a member of the National Assembly between 1988 and 2018, and the Leader of the Opposition from 2004 to 2007. He is a supporter of the Taliban government in Afghanistan and has demanded for its international recognition. In the 1980s, he was part of the Movement for the Restoration of Democracy (MRD), which was formed to end the military regime of General Zia-ul-Haq.

Rehman is a pro-Taliban politician, known for his close ties to the Islamic Emirate of Afghanistan. He has attempted to re-brand himself as a moderate without connections to religious extremists and hardliners. In the past, he has called for imposition of Sharia in Pakistan. Being a follower of Mahmud Hasan Deobandi who campaigned for liberation against the British Raj but later restricted his members from armed struggle after establishing Political party  Jamiat Ulema-e-Islam, Rehman opposed armed struggle to impose shariah laws as it leads to extremism in society. When in power in Khyber Pakhtunkhwa from 2004 to 2007, his party passed the 'Hasba Bill' which was later declared illegal and unconstitutional. Through this bill, he believed that he would be following in his father Mufti Mahmud's footsteps, as he tried to implement 'Nizam-e-Mustafa', which his father struggled for throughout his political life. However, it was declared unconstitutional by Chief Justice of Pakistan Iftikhar Chaudhry.

After defeat in the 2018 Pakistani general election, Rehman was ejected from the National Assembly and failed to win major political support in Khyber Pakhtunkhwa, bagging only 10 of the 99 seats in his home turf. Alleging election fraud, 11 opposition political parties formed the Pakistan Democratic Movement (PDM)  appointing Rehman as the president of this movement.

Early life
Rehman was born on 19 June 1953 (1 September according to another report) to a religious and political family in village Abul Kheel, D.I. Khan. His early education was from Millat High School, Multan and was a student of Mussarat Baig and Syed Iqbal Shah. He attained a Bachelor's degree (B.A) in 1983 from University of Peshawar and completed his Master's degree at Al-Azhar University Cairo.

During his early religious training and education (Ilm Us Saraf, Ilm Un Nahv, Logic) he remained the disciple  of Mufti Muhammad Essa Gurmani and Molana Abdul Ghaffor Gurmani of Shadan Lund before studying Sharah-e-Mata-e-Aamil and Hidayat-un-Nahv with Muhammad Ameer of Chudwan in a Madrassa at Jhok wains Multan . He was a student of Abdul Haq Akorwi, Hasan Jan, and Syed Sher Ali Shah during his Shahadat-ul Alamia at Darul Uloom Haqqania.
His father, Mufti Mahmud was an Islamic scholar and politician who served as the  Chief Minister of Khyber Pakhtunkhwa from 1972 to 1973. He and his family are part of the Deobandi movement.

Political career
Rehman began his political career as the secretary general of Jamiat Ulema-e-Islam in 1980 at the age of 27. This was after the death of his father Mufti Mahmud who was the leader of the party before his death.

Jamiat Ulema-e-Islam later split into two factions in the mid-1980s with the Jamiat Ulema-e-Islam (F) led by Fazal. Rehman was elected as the member of the National Assembly of Pakistan in 1988 Pakistani general elections for the first time on from D.I. Khan seat.  He then made connections with Afghan Taliban. Rehman ran for the seat of the National Assembly of Pakistan in 1990 Pakistani general elections for the second time on from D.I. Khan seat but did not win the election. Rehman was elected as the member of the National Assembly of Pakistan in 1993 Pakistani general elections for the second time on Islamic Jamhoori Mahaz ticket  from D.I. Khan seat. Fazal was appointed as the chairman of the Standing Committee for Foreign Affairs in National Assembly of Pakistan. Rehman ran for the seat of the National Assembly of Pakistan in 1997 Pakistani general elections for the fourth time but did not win the election.

Rehman led several anti-American protests and pro-Taliban rallies in the major cities of Pakistan following the war in Afghanistan in 2001. He criticised President of United States George W. Bush, and threatened to launch jihad against the United States if the bombings continued. He also criticised and warned President of the Pakistan Pervez Musharraf that he would be overthrown if he continued to support the “War on Terror”. In October 2001, Pervez Musharraf placed Fazal under house arrest in his native village Abdul Khel for inciting the citizens of Pakistan against the armed forces of Pakistan and for trying to overthrow the government of Pakistan. Later in March 2002, Fazal was set free and the cases against him were withdrawn.

Rehman was elected as the member of the National Assembly of Pakistan in 2002 Pakistani general elections for the third time on Muttahida Majlis-e-Amal ticket. He won on two seats, NA-24 and NA-25, the later was vacated. Upon winning the election, Fazal became a potential candidate for the post of prime minister of Pakistan but was not appointed. He served as the leader of the opposition from 2004 to 2007.

Rehman ran for the seat of the National Assembly of Pakistan in 2008 Pakistani general elections for the sixth time on Muttahida Majlis-e-Amal ticket from two constituencies, NA-24, D.I. Khan which is his traditional constituency and NA-26, Bannu In September 2008, he was elected chairman of the Kashmir committee of the National Assembly of Pakistan. Rehman was elected as the member of the National Assembly of Pakistan for the fourth time on Muttahida Majlis-e-Amal ticket from Bannu constituency, but he lost the election in D.I. Khan constituency. By 2008, Fazal distanced himself from Taliban and called himself a moderate.

In May 2014, Prime Minister Nawaz Sharif gave him the status of a federal minister for being the chairman of special committee of the National Assembly on Kashmir. In August 2017, Prime Minister Shahid Khaqan Abbasi gave him the same status again. Upon the dissolution of the National Assembly on the expiration of its term on 31 May 2018, he ceased to hold the status of a federal minister. In March 2018, he became head of the Muttahida Majlis-e-Amal which was revived in December 2017. Rehman ran for the seat of the National Assembly of Pakistan in 2018 Pakistani general elections from Dera Ismail Khan's constituencies, NA38 and NA 39 but did not win.

On 27 August 2018, several opposition parties including Pakistan Muslim League (N), nominated him as a candidate in the 2018 presidential election. On 4 September 2018, he clinched 184 electoral votes behind Arif Alvi (352) and ahead of Aitzaz Ahsan (124) in the election.

Wikileaks 2007 dinner with US Ambassador
According to WikiLeaks, in 2007 Rehman invited then US Ambassador to Pakistan, Anne Patterson, to a dinner in which he sought her support in becoming Prime Minister of Pakistan and expressed a desire to visit America. The ambassador wrote in her notes that Fazl sees himself as a Kingmaker. Fazl also reportedly told the ambassador that his votes were up for sale.

Controversies 
Rehman opposed the Huqooq-e-Niswan bill in 2016 claiming that it was un-Islamic. Rehman also rejected the Women's Protection Bill in 2016, which protects domestic violence victims, claiming that the judicial execution of Mumtaz Qadri was wrong and declared that he was a martyr, rallying other right-wing religious parties to do the same.

Opposition to PTI 
On numerous occasions, Rehman has displayed severe opposition to Imran Khan and his political party, the Pakistan Tehreek-e-Insaaf (PTI). In 2013 Rehman declared voting for the PTI as haram (religiously prohibited), asserting Khan to be supported by the West and the Jewish lobby and explicitly calling him an agent of "Americans, Jews, Ahmadis and a person of ill character".

Former JUI-F leader Muhammad Khan Sherani took to Twitter and said that when he asked Fazl ur-Rehman does he have proof that Imran Khan is a Jewish and Indian agent, Fazal responded with "it's just a political statement".

Azadi March

In late 2019 Rehman led a march towards Islamabad with the intent to sit-in, until PM Imran Khan resigned from office. rs   The Azadi March which translates as "Freedom March" started from Sukkur on October 27, 2019, and travelled Sindh and Punjab; other political parties also joined the march which reached Islamabad on October 31, 2019. Rehman also addressed the participants at different points on the journey. However, he could not reach his aims and ended the march on 16 November 2019.

Pakistan Democratic Movement 

In 2020, Rehman was unanimously elected as the leader of the coalition of political parties against the PTI government, the Pakistan Democratic Movement. Nawaz Sharif even favoured this appointment to be on a permanent basis but was opposed by others.

Bibliography

Books by him 
Navīd-i inqilāb : Maulānā Faz̤lurraḥmān ke inṭarviyūz kā majmūʻah, 1987, 117 p. Collection of interviews on the political conditions in Pakistan. Edited by ʻAbdulvadūd Shāhid. 
Insānī ḥuqūq, 2000, 136 p. On human rights as interpreted in Islam, with particular reference to the role of NGO's in Pakistan. Edited by Raḥīm Ḥaqqanī. 
Z̤arb-i darvesh, 2000, 446 p. Interviews on his anti-US movement; includes newspaper editorials and columns praising the movement. Edited by Riyāz̤ Durrānī.
K̲h̲ut̤bāt-i Qāʼid-i Jamʻīyat, 2002, 2 volumes. Collection of speeches in defense of radical Islamic movements in different countries and against alleged American designs to rule the world. Edited by Momin K̲h̲ān ʻUs̲mānī.
Mushāfihāt, 2017, 3 volumes. Collected interviews. Edited by Amīrzādah K̲h̲ān Yūsufzaʼī.

Books about him 
ʻAbdulqayyūm Shaik̲h̲, Maulānā Faz̤lurraḥmān ka siyāsī safar, 2004, 514 p. On his political struggle.
Momin K̲h̲ān ʻUs̲mānī, Maulānā Faẓlurraḥmān : shak̲h̲ṣiyyat o kirdār, 2017, 808 p. Biography.
Maulānā Muḥammad Qāsim Ḥaqqānī, Mīr-i kārvān̲ Maulānā Faẓlurraḥmán : duniyāʼe ṣaḥāfat kī naz̤ar men̲, 2017, 188 p. Collection of news articles on the politics of Faz̤lurraḥmān, published in various newspapers.

References

1953 births
Living people
Leaders of the Opposition (Pakistan)
Pashtun people
Deobandis
Jamiat Ulema-e-Islam (F) politicians
People from Dera Ismail Khan District
Pakistani MNAs 2013–2018
Pakistani Islamists
Pakistani MNAs 1988–1990
Pakistani MNAs 1993–1996
Pakistani MNAs 2002–2007
Pakistani MNAs 2008–2013
Muttahida Majlis-e-Amal MNAs
Al-Azhar University alumni